Ecks may refer to:
 X, a letter of the Latin alphabet
 Sumach Ecks (born 1978), American musician and yogi
 Jeremiah Ecks, a character in the film Ballistic: Ecks vs. Sever

See also 
 Eck (disambiguation)
 X (disambiguation)